Paweł Franczak (born 7 October 1991) is a Polish cyclist, who currently rides for UCI Continental team .

Major results

2011
 5th Memoriał Andrzeja Trochanowskiego
2012
 5th Memoriał Henryka Łasaka
 8th Gran Premio San Giuseppe
2013
 1st Stage 5 Carpathian Couriers Race
 4th Road race, National Under-23 Road Championships
2014
 1st Coupe des Carpathes
 2nd Road race, National Road Championships
 2nd Memoriał Henryka Łasaka
 7th Overall Tour of Małopolska
 9th Memoriał Andrzeja Trochanowskiego
2015
 1st  Points classification Szlakiem Grodów Piastowskich
 2nd Overall Course de la Solidarité Olympique
 2nd Memoriał Andrzeja Trochanowskiego
 9th Overall GP Liberty Seguros
2016
 1st Memoriał Henryka Łasaka
 Course de la Solidarité Olympique
1st  Points classification
1st Stage 1
 7th Clásica de Almería
 7th Grand Prix de Denain
 7th Eschborn–Frankfurt – Rund um den Finanzplatz
 10th Overall Tour of Estonia
2017
 3rd Overall Tour of Estonia
 3rd GP Slovakia, Visegrad 4 Bicycle Race
 4th Memoriał Andrzeja Trochanowskiego
 9th Road race, UEC European Road Championships
2018
 1st Stage 3a (TTT) Sibiu Cycling Tour
 3rd Memoriał Andrzeja Trochanowskiego
 4th Grand Prix Doliny Baryczy Milicz
 4th Memorial Grundmanna I Wizowskiego
 5th Grand Prix Alanya
 5th GP Slovakia, Visegrad 4 Bicycle Race
2019
 1st  Overall Belgrade–Banja Luka
 Visegrad 4 Bicycle Race
1st Kerekparverseny
2nd GP Slovakia
3rd GP Poland
 Bałtyk–Karkonosze Tour
1st Stages 1 & 3
 4th Road race, National Road Championships
 5th Memoriał Andrzeja Trochanowskiego
2020
 3rd Road race, National Road Championships
 3rd GP Kranj
 5th Puchar Ministra Obrony Narodowej
2021
 7th GP Polski, Visegrad 4 Bicycle Race

References

External links

1991 births
Living people
Polish male cyclists
People from Nysa, Poland
Sportspeople from Opole Voivodeship